Władysław Oleszczyński (17 December 1807 in Końskowola – 11 April 1866 in Rome) was a Polish sculptor who created a monument of Adam Mickiewicz in Poznań and the tombstone of Juliusz Słowacki at the Montmartre Cemetery in Paris.

References
 Witold Jakóbczyk, Przetrwać na Wartą 1815-1914, Dzieje narodu i państwa polskiego, vol. III-55, Krajowa Agencja Wydawnicza, Warszawa 1989

External links

1807 births
1866 deaths
People from Puławy County
Polish sculptors
Polish male sculptors
People from the Grand Duchy of Posen
19th-century sculptors
November Uprising participants